Farsta metro station is on the green line of the Stockholm metro, located in Farsta, Söderort. The station was inaugurated on 18 November 1958 when the one-station extension from Hökarängen was completed. A temporary station functioned until 4 November 1960, when the permanent station was opened. On 29 August 1971, the line was extended further to Farsta strand.

Gallery

References

Green line (Stockholm metro) stations
Railway stations opened in 1958
1958 establishments in Sweden